NGC 1282 is an elliptical galaxy located about 230 million light-years away in the constellation Perseus. It was discovered by astronomer Guillaume Bigourdan on October 23, 1884. NGC 1282 is a member of the Perseus Cluster.

A type Ia supernova designated as SN 2008fh was detected near NGC 1282 on either July 30, or August 30, 2008. Oddly, though, the supernova was not associated with the galaxy.

See also
 List of NGC objects (1001–2000)

References

External links
 

Perseus Cluster
Perseus (constellation)
Elliptical galaxies
1282
12471
Astronomical objects discovered in 1884
2675